Harney is a surname of Irish origin. Notable people with the surname include:

Ben Harney (1872–1938), American songwriter, entertainer, and pioneer of ragtime music
Ben Harney (actor), American actor and dancer, active from 1972 to 1985
Bill Harney (1895–1962), Australian bushman and author, born William Edward Harney
Bill Yidumduma Harney (born 1931), Australian Aboriginal astronomer and artist, his biological son
Corbin Harney (1920–2007), elder and spiritual leader of the Newe people, US
Corinna Harney (born 1972), American model and actress
Edward Harney (1865–1929), Irish lawyer who sat in both the Australian Senate and the British House of Commons
Elise Harney (1925–1989), pitcher in the All-American Girls Professional Baseball League
George Edward Harney (1840–1924), American architect
George Julian Harney (1817–1897), English political activist, journalist, and Chartist leader
John Hopkins Harney (1806–1868), Kentucky legislator
John Milton Harney (1789–1825), American physician and poet, brother of William S. Harney
John Paul Harney (aka Jean-Paul Harney) (born 1931), professor and former Canadian politician
Mary Harney (born 1953), Irish politician
Paul Harney (1929–2011), American professional golfer
Richard "Hacksaw" Harney (1902–1973), American Delta blues guitarist and pianist
Susan Harney (born 1946), American actress in Another World (TV series)
William Edward Harney (1895–1962), Australian writer
William S. Harney (1800–1889), cavalry officer in the U.S. Army